Konevka is a rural locality (a village) in Tigisnkoye Rural Settlement, Vozhegodsky District, Vologda Oblast, Russia. The population was 81 as of 2002.

Geography 
Konevka is located 23 km west of Vozhega (the district's administrative centre) by road. Savinskaya is the nearest rural locality.

References 

Rural localities in Vozhegodsky District